The Shimajigawa Dam is a concrete gravity dam on the Shimaji River  north of Shūnan in Yamaguchi Prefecture, Japan. The dam was completed in 1980 and was the first dam to be completely constructed with the roller-compacted concrete method.

References

Dams in Yamaguchi Prefecture
Gravity dams
Dams completed in 1980
Roller-compacted concrete dams
Shūnan, Yamaguchi